HMS Bedford was a 70-gun third rate ship of the line of the Royal Navy, launched at Woolwich Dockyard on 12 September 1698. She carried twenty-two 24-pounder guns and four (18-pounder) culverins on the lower deck; twenty-six 12-pounder guns on the upper deck; fourteen (5-pounder) sakers on the quarter-deck and forecastle; and four 3-pounder guns on the poop or roundhouse.

On 8 October 1736 Bedford was ordered to be taken to pieces and rebuilt by Joseph Allin the younger according to the 1733 proposals of the 1719 Establishment at Portsmouth, from where she was relaunched on 9 March 1741.

Bedford was hulked in 1767, and served in this capacity until 1787, when she was sold out of the navy.

Notes

References

Lavery, Brian (2003) The Ship of the Line - Volume 1: The development of the battlefleet 1650-1850. Conway Maritime Press. .

Ships of the line of the Royal Navy
1690s ships